Sergey Lagutin (born 14 January 1981) is a former professional road racing cyclist, who competed professionally between 2004 and 2018 for seven different teams, and represented both Russia and Uzbekistan in competition. He now works as a directeur sportif for UCI Continental team .

Career
In 2003, Fergana-born Lagutin became the Under-23 men's road race world champion. He represented Uzbekistan in the men's road race at the 2004 Summer Olympic Games. In 2005, he captured the Uzbekistan national road race and time trial championships. In June 2006, he rode for the  team and has captured the Commerce Bank Triple series championship in the US, as well as regaining his national road race title.

In November 2013, Lagutin announced that he had signed for the  team for the 2014 season, and also that he would ride under a Russian licence rather than for Uzbekistan. In September 2014,  announced that they had signed Lagutin on a two-year deal from 2015.

Subsequently, in September 2016,  confirmed that Lagutin would return to the team from 2017, having agreed a two-year contract.

Major results

2002
 3rd Trofeo Banca Popolare di Vicenza
 3rd Flèche Ardennaise
 4th Road race, UCI Under-23 Road World Championships
 6th Liège–Bastogne–Liège U23
 10th Tour du Jura
2003
 1st  Road race, UCI Under-23 Road World Championships
 1st Paris–Roubaix Espoirs
 Uzbekistan National Road Championships
2nd Road race
2nd Time trial
 2nd Trofej Plava Laguna Poreč II
 6th Trofeo Internazionale Bastianelli
 9th GP Istria 4
2004
 Uzbekistan National Road Championships
1st  Time trial
2nd Road race
 8th Ühispanga Tartu Tänavasoít
2005
 Uzbekistan National Road Championships
1st  Road race
1st  Time trial
 1st Kampioenschap van Vlaanderen
 5th Grand Prix de Wallonie
 6th Overall Danmark Rundt
 9th Gran Premio di Chiasso
 9th Nokere Koerse
2006
 Uzbekistan National Road Championships
1st  Road race
2nd Time trial
 1st  Overall Commerce Bank Triple Crown of Cycling
2nd Reading Classic
3rd Lancaster Classic
6th Philadelphia International Championship
 1st  Sprints classification Tour of Utah
 2nd Overall Tour de Beauce
1st  Points classification
1st Stage 3
 3rd Overall Cascade Cycling Classic
 3rd Grote Prijs Jef Scherens
 4th Paris–Brussels
 5th Grand Prix d'Isbergues
 9th Hel van het Mergelland
2007
 1st Stage 1 Rheinland-Pfalz Rundfahrt
 2nd Hel van het Mergelland
 Commerce Bank Triple Crown of Cycling
2nd Lancaster Classic
4th Reading Classic
 10th Rund um Köln
2008
 Uzbekistan National Road Championships
1st  Road race
2nd Time trial
 1st  Overall Tour de Korea-Japan
1st  Mountains classification
1st Stage 4
 4th Overall Tour of Belgium
 7th Grand Prix de Wallonie
 8th Overall Tour de Luxembourg
 9th Overall Tour of Qinghai Lake
2009
 1st  Road race, Uzbekistan National Road Championships
 6th Overall Route du Sud
2010
 1st  Road race, Uzbekistan National Road Championships
 5th Overall Circuit de Lorraine
 9th Grand Prix de Fourmies
 9th Grand Prix d'Isbergues
 10th Overall Tour de Pologne
2011
 1st  Road race, Uzbekistan National Road Championships
 5th Classic Loire Atlantique
 10th Overall Critérium International
2012
 1st  Road race, Uzbekistan National Road Championships
 1st Grand Prix of Aargau Canton
 5th Road race, Olympic Games
 5th Overall Vuelta a Andalucía
2013
 4th Overall Tour du Limousin
 9th Roma Maxima
2014
 1st Mayor Cup
 2nd Overall Grand Prix of Sochi
1st Stage 1
 2nd Overall Five Rings of Moscow
1st Stage 3
 2nd Overall Grand Prix of Adygeya
 3rd Tour of Almaty
 5th Overall Tour de Luxembourg
 6th Giro dell'Appennino
 6th Coppa Bernocchi
 7th Coppa Ugo Agostoni
 8th Memorial Oleg Dyachenko
 8th Giro di Toscana
2015
 3rd Road race, Russian National Road Championships
 3rd Overall Tour de Wallonie
 4th Overall Tour of Alberta
2016
 1st Stage 8 Vuelta a España
Held  after Stages 8 & 13
 3rd Road race, Russian National Road Championships

Grand Tour general classification results timeline

Notes

References

External links

1981 births
Living people
Uzbekistani male cyclists
Cyclists at the 2004 Summer Olympics
Cyclists at the 2008 Summer Olympics
Cyclists at the 2012 Summer Olympics
Olympic cyclists of Uzbekistan
People from Fergana
Cyclists at the 2010 Asian Games
Russian Vuelta a España stage winners
Russian male cyclists
Asian Games competitors for Uzbekistan